Sansum Clinic, founded in 1921, is one of the oldest non-profit outpatient clinics in California. Located in Santa Barbara, it is also one of the largest healthcare providers on the south and central coast of California. The Sansum Clinic was established by William Sansum, the first physician to develop and administer insulin in the U.S. to successfully treat a diabetic patient. The clinic expanded to treat other patients who did not require hospitalization. As of May 2013, Sansum Clinic's approximately 1,200 physicians, staff and scientists represent more than 30 medical specialties and subspecialties at 23 patient care locations.

History
The Sansum Clinic is an umbrella name for two of the oldest clinics in the area: the Sansum Medical Clinic and the Santa Barbara Medical Clinic. The two clinics merged in 1998 as the  Sansum-Santa Barbara Medical Foundation Clinic; in 2006, it was renamed Sansum Clinic. The Cancer Center of Santa Barbara joined the Sansum Clinic as the Cancer Center of Santa Barbara with Sansum Clinic in 2012.

Sansum Medical Clinic
In 1920, William D. Sansum (1880–1948) arrived in Santa Barbara, California to serve as head of the Potter Metabolic Clinic.  This clinic was founded in 1916 in a New York City Hospital to serve patients with diabetes, nephritis and gout. The Potter Clinic was largely funded by the Carnegie Corporation of New York, and in 1919 was moved to Santa Barbara.

Sansum specialized in diabetes, a fatal disease at the time. It was the subject of Sansum's doctoral thesis, and the related theme in nearly twenty scholarly papers he wrote in eight years. In May 1922, Sansum became the first physician to develop and administer insulin in the U.S. to successfully treat a diabetic patient. He also developed methods to obtain a higher yield of insulin from raw material.

Sansum established the Sansum Medical Clinic in 1928 to treat health problems of patients (who did not require hospitalization) with the latest research and medical advances at the time. The Sansum Medical Clinic focused on clinical specialization, assessment and treatment and  research. The clinic attracted out-of-town and out-of-state patients, especially those with diabetes, in need of specialized medical services.

Santa Barbara Medical Clinic
The Santa Barbara Clinic was established in 1921 as one of the earliest multi-specialty group medical practices in the nation.

Rexwald Brown headed the new clinic. He was influenced by watching the collaborative process of physicians in World War I, observing physicians, each with a different specialty, operating together to diagnose and treat the wounded soldiers efficiently.

He brought the same process to a civilian setting. He felt specialists could remain current in their own field, and work collaboratively with other specialists to provide the best resources and knowledge to help a patient.

This new concept gained acceptance and continued to grow; physicians were added every year as the need for different specialists was recognized. This was in contrast to the traditional role of clinics at that time which were  defined as hospital-based research-oriented facilities, treating patients with specific ailments.

Cancer Center of Santa Barbara
The Cancer Center of Santa Barbara was formed in 1950 with the donation of funds to purchase a one-million-volt x-ray machine. In 1949, Lillian Converse was treated for terminal cancer. Though she died, her husband Elisha Converse donated the funds for her doctor, Henry Ullmann, to purchase the x-ray machine in the memory of his wife; it was one of seven in the United States used to treat cancer at the time.

Through the contributions of families and charities, the non-surgical and outpatient center committed itself to advancing the understanding, diagnosis, treatment, cure and prevention of cancer.

In 2012 the Cancer Center of Santa Barbara merged with Sansum Clinic to become the Cancer Center of Santa Barbara with Sansum Clinic.

Current practice
More than 180 physicians representing more than 30 specialties are affiliated with Sansum Clinic. The clinic sees more than 150,000 patients (500,000 patient visits) per year and draws patients from all around the country, primarily serving patients throughout Santa Barbara County and the surrounding counties of Ventura, Los Angeles, Kern and San Luis Obispo.

The non-profit clinic offers health education throughout Santa Barbara and wellness programs and services at a reduced price or free, as well as a day camp for children with chronic asthma at no charge.

Locations
Sansum Clinic operates patient care facilities in Carpinteria, Santa Barbara, Goleta, Solvang, Lompoc and Santa Maria. In addition to the Cancer Center of Santa Barbara with Sansum Clinic, It also operates centers for specific medical specialties, such as the Travel & Tropical Medicine Center, Bariatric Surgery Center, Eye Care Center, Laser Eye Care Center, Facial Plastic Surgery and Aesthetics, Doctors’ Weight Management Program and Premier Physical Program.

It is also building a new ambulatory surgical center (ASC) in Santa Barbara which was scheduled to open in 2014. It is also one of the biggest employers in Santa Barbara.

Innovations
Sansum Clinic was the first place in the United States where insulin was developed and successfully administered to treat diabetes.

Sansum Clinic was among the earliest multi-specialty group practices established in the nation.

Erno Daniel was among the first physicians in the United States to be certified in the medical specialty of geriatric medicine.

Internist Paul Linaweaver  came in with a specialization in undersea medicine and was Director of the West Coast Center for the National Diving Accident Network (now Divers Alert Network).

Casimir Domz, performed the first successful bone marrow transplant in a patient with an immune deficiency.

The studies on diet and nutrition by Alfred Koehler, focused on the role fat and cholesterol play in degenerative diseases and were 20 years ahead of their time in showing a relationship between cholesterol and arteriosclerosis.

Francis and Marianna Masin were pioneers in the field of cytology, studying cells in relation to various cancers.

See also 

 Lois Jovanovič

References

External links
Official website
Sansum Clinic on Facebook

Buildings and structures in Santa Barbara, California